Melilotus indicus, sometimes incorrectly written Melilotus indica, is a yellow-flowered herb native to northern Africa, Europe and Asia, but naturalized throughout the rest of the world.

Common names in English include sweet clover (or sweet-clover), sour clover (sour-clover, sourclover), Indian sweet-clover, annual yellow sweetclover, Bokhara clover, small-flowered sweet clover, common melilot, small-flowered melilot, small melilot, sweet melilot, Californian lucerne and Hexham scent. In Australia and New Zealand, where it is naturalised, it is sometimes called King Island melilot or King Island clover.

Description
Similar to Melilotus altissima Thuill. in general. The flowers are 2 – 3 mm long they produces a hairless pod of similar length.

Taxonomy
It was first published as Trifolium indicum by Carl Linnaeus in his 1753 Species plantarum. It was transferred into Melilotus by Carlo Allioni in 1785.

Distribution and habitat
It has a wide native distribution, ranging from Macaronesia and northern Africa, through Europe, and into temperate and tropical Asia. It is naturalised throughout most of the rest of the world, including the United Kingdom, the United States, South America, Australia and New Zealand.

Uses and economic importance
It is used as a source of nectar for bees, as forage, and as a soil improver. It is also used in folk medicine. It is poisonous to some mammals, and is a potential seed crop contaminant.

In Pakistan, Melilotus indicus is called sinji, which is used as a vegetable. It has many medicinal uses. It has antioxidant properties . It also has alpha-amylase inhibitory activities , because of which it may be useful for type 2 diabetes.

References

External links 
 Jepson Manual Treatment

Trifolieae
Flora of Europe
Flora of Asia
Flora of North Africa
Plants described in 1753
Taxa named by Carl Linnaeus